Al-Dumun was a Palestinian Arab village in the Haifa Subdistrict. It was depopulated during the 1947–1948 Civil War in Mandatory Palestine on April 30, 1948. It was located 10.5 km southeast of Haifa.

History
A known cave located in the area was used as a sheep fold. Flints artefacts from the cave had been dated to the Neolithic period.

In 1881 the PEF's Survey of Western Palestine noted at Duweimin  “foundations."

British Mandate era
In the 1922 census of Palestine conducted by the British Mandate authorities,  Al Damun had a population of 19 Muslims, while in the 1931 census, it was counted under Isfiya.

In the 1945 statistics the village had a population of 340 Muslims, and the total land area was 2,797 dunams.   Of this, 5 dunams were used for citrus and bananas,   280 were for plantations and irrigable land, 1,619 for cereals, while 893 dunams were non-cultivable land.

1948, aftermath
At the end of April, 1948, the villagers surrendered  without a fight, and the village was garrisoned by the Haganah. The villagers were, at first, allowed to stay.   Morris notes that part of the document stating this has been blacked out by the IDF censors, presumably, according to Morris, as the writer have suggested that the villagers were to be expelled.

In 1992, the remains were described: "All that remains from the village is a building now used as a prison. Cactuses and few remaining fruit trees, such as pomegranate and almond trees, grown on the site. The land is forested and the area is currently used by Israelis for recreation."

References

Bibliography

External links
Welcome To al-Damun, Khirbat
Khirbat al-Damun,   Zochrot 
Survey of Western Palestine, Map 5: IAA, Wikimedia commons

Arab villages depopulated prior to the 1948 Arab–Israeli War
District of Haifa
Prisons in Israel